102 Minutes That Changed America is a 102-minute American television special documentary film that was produced by the History channel and premiered commercial-free on Thursday, September 11, 2008, marking the seventh anniversary of the September 11 attacks. Its name comes from the timespan from the first impact of American Airlines Flight 11 and the collapse of the World Trade Center. The film depicts, in virtually real time, the New York-based events of the attacks primarily using raw footage from mostly amateur citizen journalists, focusing mainly on the reactions of New York inhabitants during the incident. The documentary is accompanied by an 18-minute documentary short called I-Witness to 9/11, which features interviews with nine firsthand eyewitnesses who captured the footage on camera.

According to this film, most of the archival footage was in possession of the U.S. government but was not released to History until years after 9/11.
The documentary film attracted 5.2 million viewers.
The program aired on Channel 4 in the UK, France 3 in France, History Channel in Brazil on 7 September 2009, SBS6, in the Netherlands on 9 September 2009 and on ZDF in 2009 and 2010. The 7 September 2021 was aired in Catalonia on TV3's program Sense ficció. In this channel, the film featured a high audience with 345,000 viewers and 18.4% share, thus achieving the program's best record since 18 May 2021. A&E Television Networks, parent company of History, aired it across all of their cable networks on September 11, 2011, at 8:46 a.m. EDT, the exact time American Airlines Flight 11 crashed into 1 World Trade Center ten years earlier.

Awards and nominations

2009 Emmy Awards
In 2009, the documentary won three Primetime Emmy Awards, out of four nominations, for the following categories:
 Outstanding Nonfiction Special
 Outstanding Sound Editing for Nonfiction Programming (Single or Multi-Camera)
 Outstanding Sound Mixing for Nonfiction Programming
 Outstanding Picture Editing for Nonfiction Programming (nomination)

See also
102 Minutes: The Untold Story of the Fight to Survive Inside the Twin Towers (2005 book)
Hotel Ground Zero (2009 TV movie)
The Miracle of Stairway B (2006 TV special)
 World Trade Center (1973–2001)
 JFK: 3 Shots That Changed America

References

External links
 DVD at History.com Shop
 
 Review at The Third Estate

2008 television films
2008 films
History (American TV channel) original programming
Documentary films about the September 11 attacks
American documentary television films
2008 documentary films
Television series about the history of the United States
Films about high-rise fires
Primetime Emmy Award-winning broadcasts
2000s English-language films
2000s American films